The Commonwealth Games Council for Scotland announced on 3 November 2005 that Scotland would be sending 166 athletes (104 men and 62 women) to compete in the 2006 Commonwealth Games in Melbourne, supported by 70 officials. This is a smaller team than the country fielded at the 2002 Commonwealth Games in Manchester, England, when Scotland sent 207 athletes and 85 officials, winning 6 Gold, 8 Silver and 16 Bronze medals.

The main team's departure was on 28 February 2006 from Glasgow Airport flying with Emirates Airlines, one of the team's main sponsors. Other sources of financial support are the Clydesdale Bank, sportscotland, the Commonwealth Games Endowment fund, and the Scottish general public.

Scotland had been adversely affected by the withdrawal of judo from the 2006 programme, where it had won many medals in previous games.

Despite the withdrawal of judo the team had a hugely successful games and brought back its highest medal total ever.

The team was sponsored by the Clydesdale Bank.

Medals

Gold
Boxing:
 Kenneth Anderson, Light Heavyweight 81 kg

Cycling:
 Ross Edgar, Chris Hoy & Craig MacLean, Men's Team Sprint

Bowls:
 Alex Marshall & Paul Foster, Men's Doubles

Shooting:
 Sheena Sharp and Susan Jackson, Women's 50 m Rifle Prone Pairs
 Sheena Sharp, Women's 50 m Rifle Prone Individual

Swimming:
 David Carry, Men's 400 m Freestyle
 David Carry, Men's 400 m Individual Medley
 Caitlin McClatchey, Women's 200 m Freestyle
 Caitlin McClatchey, Women's 400 m Freestyle
 Gregor Tait, Men's 200 m Backstroke
 Gregor Tait, Men's 200 m Individual Medley

Silver
Athletics:
 Chris Baillie, Men's 110 m Hurdles

Cycling:
 Ross Edgar, Men's Sprint

Bowls:
 Joyce Lindores & Kay Moran Women's Bowls Pairs

Shooting:
 Martin Sinclair & Neil Stirton, Men's 50 m Rifle Prone Pairs

Swimming:
 Kirsty Balfour, Women's 200 m Breaststroke
 Euan Dale, Men's Individual Medley
 David Carry, Euan Dale, Andrew Hunter & Robert Renwick, Men's 200 m Freestyle Relay

Bronze
Athletics:
 Lee McConnell, Women's 400 m Hurdles

Badminton:
 Susan Hughes, Women's Singles

Cycling:
 Kate Cullen, Women's Points Race
 Ross Edgar, Men's Keirin
 Chris Hoy, Men's 1 km Time Trial
 James McCallum, Men's Scratch

Gymnastics:
 Adam Cox, Men's Horizontal Bar

Swimming:
 Kirsty Balfour, Women's 100 m Breaststroke.
 Gregor Tait, Men's 100 m Backstroke.
 Gregor Tait, Todd Cooper, Craig Houston & Kris Gilchrist, Men's 4x100 m Medley Relay.

Weightlifting:
 Thomas Yule, Men's 94 kg

Scotland's Commonwealth Games Team 2006

Aquatics

Diving
Monique McCarroll Diving platform

Swimming

Men's
David Carry – 200 m, 400 m freestyle
Ross Clark – 50 m breast
Todd Cooper – 50 m, 100 m, 200 m butterfly
Euan Dale – 200 m, 400 m individual medley
Kris Gilchrist – 200 m breast
Craig Houston – 50 freestyle
Andrew Hunter – 200 freestyle
Chris Jones – 50 m breast
Robert Lee – 50 m breast
David Leith – 50 m butterfly
Robbie Renwick – 200 m freestyle
Gregor Tait* – 100 m backstroke, 200 m backstroke, 200 m individual medley

Women's
Kirsty Balfour – 100 m breast, 200 m breast
Fiona Booth – 50 m breast
Kerry Buchan – 100 m breast, 200 m breast
Stephanie Hill – 100 m butterfly
Caitlin McClatchey – 200 m, 400 m, 800 m freestyle
Hannah Miley – 400 m individual medley
Lorna Smith – 400 m individual medley
Lara Fergusson – 50 m, 100 m freestyle (EAD)

Athletics

Men's
Chris Baillie – 110 m hurdles
Iain Park* – Hammer
Darren Ritchie – Long jump
Allan Scott – 110 m hurdles
Kevin Sheppard – 3000 m steeplechase
Nick Stewart – 400 m hurdles
Mark Taylor* – high jump

Women's
Kathy Butler – 5,000 m, 10,000 m
Gillian Cooke – Long jump
Shona Crombie–Hicks – Marathon
Collette Fagan – 10,000 m
Hayley Haining – Marathon
Lee McConnell – 200 m, 400 m, 400 m hurdles
Kirsty Maguire – Paul Vault
Hayley Ovens – 1,500 m
Susan Partridge – Marathon
Susan Scott – 800 m, 1500 m
Shirley Webb – Hammer

Badminton

Men's
Andrew Bowman – mixed doubles

Women's
Susan Hughes – singles
Kirsteen McEwan – mixed doubles
Yuan Wemyss* – singles and ladies doubles

Basketball

Men's 
Keiron Achara
Robert Archibald
Keith Bunyan
Laurie Costello
Mark Duncan
Campbell Flockhart
Stuart Mackay
Gareth Murray
Tom Pearson
Scott Russell
James Steel
Joshua Tackie
Ross Szifris
Dan Wardrope

(Non travelling reserves have also been identified.)

Boxing 
Mitch Prince – 60 kg
Mark Hastie* – 64 kg
Kris Carslaw – 69 kg
Craig McEwan* – 75 kg
Kenny Anderson – 81 kg
Stephen Simmons* – 91 kg

Cycling

Men's
Alex Coutts – Road Race
Ross Edgar – Track Sprint Events
Chris Hoy – Track Sprint Events
Marco Librizzi – Track Sprint Events
Craig MacLean – Track Sprint Events
Gareth Montgomerie – Mountain Bike Cross Country
Evan Oliphant – Road Race
James Ouchterlony – Mountain Bike Cross Country
Duncan Urquhart – Road Race
Robert Wardell – Mountain Bike Cross Country

Women's
Kate Cullen – Track Points Race and Road Race
Ruth McGavigan – Mountain Bike Cross Country

Field Hockey

Men's team
Jonathan Christie
Michael Christie
Allan Dick
Stephen Dick
Graham Dunlop
Michael Leonard
Adam MacKenzie
David Mansouri
Vishal Marwaha
Alistair McGregor
David Mitchell
Graham Moodie
David Ralph
Mark Ralph
Douglas Simpson
Niall Stott
Head coach: Mathias Ahrens

Reserves: Gareth Hall and Derek Salmond.

Women's team
Vikki Bunce
Jane Burley
Louise Carroll
Linda Clement
Catriona Forrest
Samantha Judge
Nikki Kidd
Julie Kilpatrick
Debbie McLeod
Louise Munn
Cath Rae
Emma Rochlin
Alison Rowatt
Catriona Semple
Rhona Simpson
Cheryl Valentine
Head coach: Lesley Hobley

Reserves: Holly Cram and Katrina Cameron.

Gymnastics

Men's
Adam Cox Men's Artistic
Steve Frew Men's Artistic
Daniel Keatings Men's Artistic
Barry Koursarys Men's Artistic
Andrew Mackie Men's Artistic

Women's
Carol Galashan Women's Artistic
Helen Galashan Women's Artistic
Jennifer Hannah Women's Artistic
Rosalie Hutton* Women's Artistic
Emma White Women's Artistic

Lawn Bowls

Men's
Darren Burnett-Singles
Paul Foster – Pairs
Alex Marshall – Pairs
David Peacock – Triples
Colin Mitchell – Triples
Colin Peacock – Triples

Women 
Margaret Letham – singles
Kay Moran -pairs
Joyce Lindores – pairs
Linda Brennan – triples
Betty Forsyth – triples
Seona Black – triples

Rugby Sevens
Ciaran Beattie
Oli Brown
David Gray
Colin Gregor
Clark Laidlaw
Rory Lawson
Mark Lee
Ross Rennie
Alasdair Strokosch
Andrew Turnbull
Alistair Warnock

Shooting

Men's
Robert Carroll – Standard pistol & Centre-Fire Pistol
Stewart Cumming – Double trap
Robin Law – 10 m Air Rifle
David Lewis – Air pistol & Free Pistol
Ian Marsden – Skeet
Jonathan Reid – Trap
Alan Ritchie – Air pistol & Free Pistol
Graham Rudd – 50 m 3-Positions & 10 m Air Rifle
Ian Shaw – Fullbore rifle
Martin Sinclair – 50 m Prone Rifle & 50 m 3-Positions
Neil Stirton – 50 m Prone Rifle
Michael Thomson – Skeet

Women's
Emma Cole Hamilton – 50 m 3-Positions & 10 m Air Rifle
Susan Jackson – 50 m 3-Positions & 50 m Prone Rifle
Shona Marshall – Olympic Trap
Heather Rudd – 10 m Air Rifle
Sheena Sharp – 50 m Prone Rifle

Squash
Harry Leitch (men's doubles)
Frania Gillen-Buchert (women's doubles)
Pam Nimmo (mixed doubles)
Louise Philip (women's doubles)
John White (singles)

Triathlon
Catriona Morrison
Kerry Lang

Weightlifting 
Peter Kirkbride (85 kg)
Thomas Yule (91 kg)

Note
* – athletes with known injuries at time of selection who were required to prove full fitness by 15 January 2006.

See also
Commonwealth Games Council for Scotland
Scotland at the 2002 Commonwealth Games

References

External links
Scotland Commonwealth Games Team: Melbourne, Australia 2006

2006
Nations at the 2006 Commonwealth Games
Commonwealth Games